Miss America's Outstanding Teen 2006 was the first Miss America's Outstanding Teen pageant, held at the Linda Chapin Theater in the Orange County Convention Center in Orlando, Florida on August 20, 2005. At the conclusion of the event, Meghan Miller of Texas was crowned Miss America's Outstanding Teen 2006 by Miss America 2005 Deidre Downs.

Results

Placements

Other awards

Pageant

Selection of contestants
One delegate from each state, District of Columbia, and the Virgin Islands were chosen in state pageants held from September 2004 to June 2005.

Preliminaries
During the 3 days prior to the final night, the delegates compete in the preliminary competition, which involves private interviews with the judges and a show where they compete in talent, evening wear, casual wear, lifestyle and fitness in active wear, and on-stage question. They were held from August 17-19, 2005.

Finals 
During the final competition, the top 15 compete in casual wear and evening wear, the top 10 compete in talent, and the top 5 compete in on-stage question.

Contestants 
52 delegates participated:

References 

2006
2006 in Florida
2006 beauty pageants